Hyderabad Black Hawks is a men's volleyball team from Hyderabad, Telangana playing in the Prime Volleyball League in India. The current owner of the club is Vijay Deverakonda. The team was founded as Black Hawks Hyderabad in 2018 and owned by Agile Entertainment Pvt Ltd. The team had participated in the only season of the dissolved Pro Volleyball League in 2019 before it switched to Prime Volleyball League with a new ownership in 2021.

Honors
 Prime Volleyball League
 Third Place: 2022

Team

Current team

Administration and support staff

References 

Men's volleyball teams
Volleyball in India
Sports clubs in India